Kalegauk Island is an island in Ye Township, Mon State, Burma (Myanmar). It is located in the Andaman Sea,  from the coast of Mon State.

Geography

Nearby islands

See also
List of islands of Burma

References 

Mon State
Islands of Myanmar